The Zee Cine Award Best Cinematography is a technical award.

The winners are listed below:-

See also 
 Zee Cine Awards
 Bollywood
 Cinema of India

References

External links
 Winners of the 2008 Zee Cine Awards

Cinematography
Awards for best cinematography